This article lists Sinn Féin's election results in UK parliamentary elections.

Summary of general election performance

Notes
For the 1918 election, MPs are given out of the Ireland total. For subsequent elections, MP totals are for Northern Ireland.

Four Sinn Féin candidates were elected in two constituencies each, so Sinn Féin actually had 69 out of 101 Irish MPs. In what was to become Northern Ireland, Sinn Féin won 3 seats out of a possible 30.

Election results

By-elections 1906–1910

By-elections, 1910–1918

1918 general election

Cork City was a two-seat constituency, and both Sinn Féin candidate were elected.

By-elections, 1918–22

1924 general election

1950 general election

McAteer stood as an independent republican candidate.

1955 general election

By-elections, 1955–59

1959 general election

1964 general election
These Sinn Féin members stood as Independent Republican candidates.

1966 general election
These Sinn Féin members stood as Independent Republican candidates.

By-elections, 1979–83
These Sinn Féin members stood as Anti H-Block candidates.

1983 general election

By-elections, 1983–87

1987 general election

By-elections, 1987–92

1992 general election

1997 general election

By-elections, 1997–2001

2001 general election

2005 general election

2010 general election

By-elections, 2010–15

2015 general election

2017 general election

By-elections, 2017–2019

2019 general election
Sinn Féin did not stand candidates in Belfast East, Belfast South or North Down in order to aid anti-Brexit and anti-Democratic Unionist Party candidates in those constituencies.

Footnotes

References

F. W. S. Craig, Chronology of British Parliamentary By-elections 1833–1987

Sinn Féin
Election results by party in the United Kingdom